

Eadhelm was a medieval Bishop of Selsey.

Eadhelm attests documents from 963 to 979.

Eadhelm died between 979 and 980.

Citations

References

External links
 

Bishops of Selsey
10th-century English bishops